The Nose was a satirical magazine based in San Francisco. It was founded by Jack Boulware and David Latimer in 1988 and published from 1989 to 1995, with 5 issues a year.

Boulware said he conceived of The Nose as "a satirical investigative magazine along the lines of Spy. Except instead of New York and the Ivy League, it would be about the America I knew – the Western U.S., filled with crackers and outlaws and freaks."

Contributors to The Nose included Patton Oswalt, Marc Maron, Will Durst, Greg Proops, Gregg Turkington and Rebecca G. Wilson.

Topics covered by The Nose included: Area 51, Anton LaVey, deaths at Disneyland and Autoerotic asphyxiation with John Deere tractors.

The magazine ceased publication in 1995. Boulware attributes The Noses demise to mismanagement of funds by the magazine's accountant.

Boulware and former Nose staffers and fans held a 20th-anniversary celebration at The Hemlock Tavern in April 2009.

References

Satirical magazines published in the United States
Culture of San Francisco
Magazines published in San Francisco
Defunct magazines published in the United States
Magazines established in 1988
Magazines disestablished in 1995